Meieribyen is the administrative center of Skiptvet, Norway.

Villages in Østfold
Skiptvet